Kanchana or Kanjana is an Indic-language-based name, often used as a feminine given name. People with the name include:

 Kanchana (actress), stage name of Vasundhara Devi, Indian actress born 1939
 Kanchana Gunawardene, Sri Lankan cricketer
 Kanchana Kamalanathan, Indian politician
 Kanchana Kanchanasut, Thai computer scientist
 Kanjana Kuthaisong, Thai volleyball player
 Kanchana Mendis, Sri Lankan actress
 Kanchana Moitra, Bengali film actress
 Kanchana Silpa-archa, Thai politician
 Kanjana Sungngoen, Thai footballer
 Kanchana Wijesekera, Sri Lankan politician
 Ama Kanchana, Sri Lankan cricketer
 Dilshan Kanchana, Sri Lankan cricketer
 Janaka Kanchana, Sri Lankan Guinness world record holder

See also
 Kanchana

Indian feminine given names
Sinhalese unisex given names
Sinhalese surnames
Thai feminine given names